The Haskell Indian Nations Fighting Indians football program was a college football team that represented Haskell Indian Nations University. The team consisted of three coaches that have been inducted into the College Football Hall of Fame: John H. Outland, Matty Bell, and William Henry Dietz.

From 1937 until 1999, the school operated either as a high school or junior college.  During this time the school fielded various football teams, but they are not listed here as being a part of the four-year college football program.

Key

Coaches

See also
 List of people from Lawrence, Kansas

Notes

References

Lists of college football head coaches

Kansas sports-related lists